This article is a list of diseases of Capsicum species.

Bacterial diseases

Fungal diseases

Nematodes, parasitic

Viral diseases

Post-harvest diseases

Abiotic diseases

References
Common Names of Diseases, The American Phytopathological Society
Pepper Diseases (Fact Sheets and Information Bulletins), The Cornell Plant Pathology Vegetable Disease Web Page

Capsicum